Roger Federer defeated Rafael Nadal in the final, 6–4, 6–4 to win the men's singles tennis title at the 2009 Madrid Open.

Andy Murray was the defending champion, but lost in the quarterfinals to Juan Martín del Potro.

The semifinal match between Nadal and Novak Djokovic was (at the time) the longest men's tennis match in the Open Era played with the best-of-three-sets system, stretching for 4 hours and 3 minutes with Nadal prevailing, 3–6, 7–6(7–5), 7–6(11–9) after saving three match points in the third-set tiebreak. This record was later broken by Federer and del Potro at the 2012 London Olympics in their 4-hour and 26-minute semifinal match.

This was the first edition of the tournament to be held on outdoor clay courts, having previously been held on indoor hard courts.

Seeds
The top eight seeds receive a bye into the second round.

Draw

Finals

Top half

Section 1

Section 2

Bottom half

Section 3

Section 4

Qualifying

Seeds

Qualifiers

Lucky losers

Qualifying draw

First qualifier

Second qualifier

Third qualifier

Fourth qualifier

Fifth qualifier

Sixth qualifier

Seventh qualifier

References

External links
Main Draw
Qualifying Draw

Mutua Madrilena Madrid Open - Men's Singles
Men's Singles